The Netherlands Space Office (NSO) is the space agency of the Netherlands.

Creation
Three Dutch government ministries — the Ministry of Economic Affairs and Climate Policy; the Ministry of Education, Culture and Science; and the Ministry of Infrastructure and Water Management — along with the Netherlands Organization for Scientific Research (NWO), an independent administrative body under the auspices of the Dutch-government Ministry of Education, Culture and Science, signed an agreement in October 2008 for the establishment of the NSO.

It was established as of 1 July 2009 following the merger of the space activities of the Netherlands Agency for Aerospace Programmes (in Dutch language, Nederlands Instituut voor Vliegtuigontwikkeling en Ruimtevaart (NIVR)), which was then disestablished, and several other institutes (KNMI, SRON).

Purpose
NSO was established by the Dutch government to advise on the Netherlands Space Policy and to develop and administer the country's space programme. NSO represents The Netherlands to international space organisations, including the multi-country-member European Space Agency (ESA); the United States National Aeronautics and Space Administration (NASA) and the Japan Aerospace Exploration Agency (JAXA). NSO is also the central government point of contact for the space community in the Netherlands.

The NSO also promotes education and communication on space, especially the Netherlands space activities.

Administration
The director of NSO reports to the steering committee of the ministries. In terms of organisation and administration, the NSO resorts under RVO, an agency of the Ministry of Economic Affairs and Climate Policy.

See also
List of government space agencies
European Space Agency (ESA)
Japan Aerospace Exploration Agency (JAXA)
National Aeronautics and Space Administration (NASA)
Netherlands Agency for Aerospace Programmes (in Dutch language, Nederlands Instituut voor Vliegtuigontwikkeling en Ruimtevaart (NIVR))
Netherlands Institute for Space Research

External links
spaceoffice.nl, Netherlands Space Office (NSO) official website (website in Dutch language; toggle switch to English-language version offered in top bar).  Accessed 12 February 2010.

Government agencies of the Netherlands
Government agencies established in 2009
Science and technology in the Netherlands
Space agencies
2009 establishments in the Netherlands